was a village located in Kanzaki District, Saga Prefecture, Japan.

As of 2003, the village had an estimated population of 6,507 and a population density of 196.65 persons per km2. The total area was 33.09 km2.

On March 1, 2006, Higashisefuri, along with the town of Mitagawa (also from Kanzaki District), was merged to create the town of Yoshinogari.

Dissolved municipalities of Saga Prefecture